The company Services automobiles de la vallée de Chevreuse commonly called SAVAC provides a network of passenger transport in Île-de-France, in the south of Yvelines dans the west of Essonne.

Bus lines

Bus lines in Essonne

Bus Lines in Yvelines

External links
 Official Website of SAVAC
 Map of SAVAC lines

Transport in Île-de-France
Bus companies of France